A Gift From a Flower to a Garden is the fifth album from Scottish singer-songwriter Donovan, released in December 1967 through Pye Records in the UK and Epic Records in the US. It marks the first double-disc album of Donovan's career and one of the first box sets in pop music. In the US, Epic also released the two discs separately as the stand-alone albums Wear Your Love Like Heaven and For Little Ones.

A Gift from a Flower to a Garden spent 14 weeks on the UK charts, peaking at number 13. In the US, it spent 22 weeks on the US Billboard 200, peaking at number 19. In 1970, the album earned a Gold Record award for half a million sales.

History
After recording the Mellow Yellow album, Donovan focused on releasing hit singles. "Epistle to Dippy" (essentially an inside-joke/open letter for a childhood friend) hit the top 20 in February 1967 and "There is a Mountain" (#11 US; No. 8 UK) followed in August.

Riding high on the success of these singles, Donovan entered the studio in October to record his next album. The double-disc album that resulted from these sessions consisted of one disc of acoustic and electric soul music (Wear Your Love Like Heaven) and another of acoustic children's music (For Little Ones). The acoustic album allowed Donovan to present a facet of his songwriting that had not been featured on his singles. It also allowed him to show his strength as a guitar player and performer in a way that he could not when augmented by session musicians. In fact, Donovan's live performances of the time featured instrumentation and performances more in line with For Little Ones than his hit singles and the first record of A Gift From a Flower to a Garden.

While Mickie Most produced the single from the album ("Wear Your Love Like Heaven" b/w "Oh Gosh"), and is credited with the album's production, Donovan actually produced the bulk of the material himself, allowing Most the credit to help sales.

In the album's liner notes, Donovan explained his purpose in creating two rather different discs (one for the present generation, and the other for the "dawning generation"), and also denounced the use of drugs. Several of his earlier records had contained both veiled and open references to drug use (particularly marijuana and LSD), but since the release of Mellow Yellow, he had both been arrested and prosecuted for marijuana possession, and had seen people he knew turning to harder drugs (speed, heroin, cocaine), and the damage this caused in their lives. Instead, Donovan promoted the use of meditation and other techniques, in his new songs.

Songs

"Mad John's Escape" is a song written for a friend of Donovan's who escaped from a mental health centre. The song details Mad John's escape and subsequent adventures.

"Under the Greenwood Tree" is originally written by William Shakespeare in As You Like It, and set to music by Donovan for the Royal National Theatre, who planned to use it in a stage production. At the end of the song, Donovan sings "Will you, won't you... join the dance?" in reference to the chorus of "The Lobster Quadrille" in Chapter X of Lewis Carroll's Alice's Adventures in Wonderland.

"Epistle to Derroll" is dedicated to the banjo player and singer Derroll Adams, an early influence on Donovan.

Cover

The front cover photo design of Wear Your Love Like Heaven features a Pre-Raphaelite style infrared photograph (requiring six colour separations for printing, instead of the usual four separations) of Donovan on the moat in front of Bodiam Castle by Karl Ferris, who was his and Jimi Hendrix's personal photographer. The back cover photo was also a shot taken by Ferris in Los Angeles during Donovan's and Karl's initiation into Transcendental Meditation, and depicted Donovan visiting with Maharishi Mahesh Yogi.

Release
The album was released in the US (Epic Records L2N 6071 (monaural) / B2N 171 (stereo)) and the UK in December 1967 (Pye Records NPL 20000 (monaural) / NSPL 20000 (stereo)). At the same time, Epic Records also released each of the two records from A Gift From a Flower to a Garden as separate stand alone albums in the US. The first record was released as Wear Your Love Like Heaven, and the second record was released as For Little Ones. This was done to allow budgeting for the double-disc album package, which included a folder of the printed lyrics to the second disc with artwork, and a cover featuring an infrared photo of Donovan by Karl Ferris who was his and Jimi Hendrix's personal photographer.

Reception

A Gift from a Flower to a Garden spent 14 weeks on the UK charts, peaking at number 13. In the US, it spent 22 weeks on the US Billboard 200, peaking at number 19. In 1970, the album earned a Gold Record award for half a million sales.

AllMusic stated that the album "stands out as a prime artifact of the flower-power era that produced it," and noted that while "the music still seems a bit fey … the sheer range of subjects and influences make this a surprisingly rewarding work."

Track listing

Original double-length album
All tracks by Donovan Leitch, except where noted.

Wear Your Love Like Heaven (first part)
Side 1
"Wear Your Love Like Heaven" – 2:30
"Mad John's Escape" – 2:16
"Skip-a-Long Sam" – 2:23
"Sun" – 3:13
"There Was a Time" – 1:59

Side 2
"Oh Gosh" – 1:42
"Little Boy in Corduroy" – 2:33
"Under the Greenwood Tree" (Words by William Shakespeare, music by Leitch) – 1:53
"The Land of Doesn't Have to Be" – 2:32
"Someone's Singing" – 2:44

For Little Ones (second part)
Side 1
"Song of the Naturalist's Wife" – 2:53
"The Enchanted Gypsy" – 3:19
"Voyage into the Golden Screen" – 3:12
"Isle of Islay" – 2:20
"The Mandolin Man and His Secret" – 3:32
"Lay of the Last Tinker" – 1:47

Side 2
"The Tinker and the Crab" – 2:52
"Widow with a Shawl (A Portrait)" – 2:58
"The Lullaby of Spring" – 3:25
"The Magpie" – 1:27
"Starfish-on-the-Toast" – 2:39
"Epistle to Derroll" – 5:45

Personnel
Donovan – vocals, guitar, harmonica, whistling 
Eric Leese – electric guitar
Cliff Barton – bass
Jack Bruce – bass on "Someone Singing"
Ken Baldock – double bass
Mike O'Neill – keyboards
Keith Webb – drums
Tony Carr – drums, bells, congas, finger cymbals
Mike Carr – vibraphone 
"Candy" John Carr – congas
Harold McNair – flute

Release history

Reissues
In 1993, BGO Records reissued A Gift from a Flower to a Garden on compact disc in the UK. Mono and Stereo versions were issued. See https://www.discogs.com/Donovan-A-Gift-From-A-Flower-To-A-Garden/release/3875953 for details.
On 12 September 2000, Collector's Choice Music reissued A Gift from a Flower to a Garden on compact disc in the US.
On 16 January 2001, Collectables Records released Mellow Yellow/Wear Your Love Like Heaven (Collectables 6644), which contained all of Mellow Yellow and the Wear Your Love Like Heaven portion of A Gift from a Flower to a Garden.
On 26 January 2009, EMI reissued A Gift from a Flower to a Garden, remastered, on compact disc with under a license agreement with Donovan.
On 28 January 2022, State51 Conspiracy released a remastered mono version of ‘’A Gift from a Flower to a Garden’’, as a double compact disc.

References

External links
 A Gift From A Flower To A Garden – Donovan Unofficial Site

Donovan albums
1967 albums
Albums produced by Mickie Most
1967 compilation albums